Nurshamil bin Abd Ghani (born 25 September 1994) is a Malaysian professional footballer who plays for Malaysia Super League club Kelantan as a forward.

Nurshamil is also Melaka United's topscorer in the 2015 Malaysia FAM League. He also well known with his new ability to being super-sub as he has managed to score last minute goal as substitute player in two early 2016 Malaysia Premier League matches against Sime Darby and PKNS.

Club career

Selangor
On 17 February 2017, Nurshamil made his debut coming from the bench at the 83rd minute of the match. Selangor won that match by 3–1.

Penang
In 2020, he joined Penang for one-year deal.

Kelantan

In 2021, Nurshamil signed for Malaysia Premier League side Kelantan. Nurshamil managed to score 9 goals in the league and became local topscorer in Malaysia Premier League. During 2022 season, Nurshamil have managed to score 5 league goals in only 9 league games for Kelantan makes him one of lethal striker in Malaysia Premier League.

Personal life
Nurshamil was born in Malacca. He is of Malay descent and was brought up as a Islam; Nurshamil attended Paya Rumput Primary School, Dato' Dol Said Secondary School and Malacca High School.

Career statistics

Club

Honours

Club
Melaka United
 Malaysia FAM League: 2015
 Malaysia Premier League: 2016

Penang
 Malaysia Premier League: 2020

References

External links
 

1995 births
Living people
Malaysian footballers
People from Malacca
Melaka United F.C. players
PKNS F.C. players
Kelantan F.C. players
Malaysia Super League players
Malaysia Premier League players
Singapore Premier League players
Association football forwards